An NOC may enter up to six athletes, two male and two female athletes in singles events and up to one men's and one women's team in team events.

Qualification summary

Qualifiers

Singles 
A total of 69 athletes qualified for each singles event as follows:

†: Athlete qualified for team event only.

Men

* Highest ranked South Asian athlete.

Women

* Guo Yan is replaced by Ding Ning.

** Highest ranked South Asian athlete.

Team
Sixteen teams, including one team from each of six continents and the host NOC, qualified the team events. The qualification of an NOC was based on the number of the qualified players and the ranking of the 2012 World Team Championships. The 2012 World Team Championships were held from March 25 to April 1, 2012, in Dortmund, Germany. A total of fourteen quota places per gender were reserved for completing qualified teams representing NOCs with less than three qualified individual athletes. Eight men's quotas and four women's quotas remained unused, and were  transferred to the singles competition of the same gender and added to the Final Qualification Tournament.

Men's team

Women's team

References

External links
 International Table Tennis Federation (ITTF)

Qualification for the 2012 Summer Olympics